Josh Cantrell (born 18 February 1999) is an English cricketer. He made his first-class debut on 26 March 2019, for Cambridge MCCU against Essex, as part of the Marylebone Cricket Club University fixtures.

References

External links
 

1999 births
Living people
English cricketers
Cambridge MCCU cricketers
Suffolk cricketers
Place of birth missing (living people)
English cricketers of the 21st century